Scinax cabralensis is a species of frog in the family Hylidae. It is endemic to Brazil.

References

cabralensis
Endemic fauna of Brazil
Amphibians described in 2007